General Zimmerman may refer to:

Charles X. Zimmerman (1865–1926), U.S. Army brigadier general 
Don Z. Zimmerman (1903–1983), U.S. Air Force brigadier general
Matthew A. Zimmerman (born 1941), U.S. Army major general

See also
Bodo Zimmermann (1886–1963), Nazi German Army lieutenant general
Carl Heinrich Zimmermann (1864–1949), German Imperial Army major general